The 2022 Maryland Comptroller election was held on November 8, 2022, to elect the next Comptroller of Maryland. Incumbent Democratic Comptroller Peter Franchot declined to run for a fifth term and instead ran unsuccessfully for Governor of Maryland.

Democratic primary

Candidates

Nominee
 Brooke Lierman, state delegate for the 46th district (2015–present) and attorney

Eliminated in primary
 Tim Adams, mayor of Bowie (2019–present)

Declined
 Kumar P. Barve, state delegate for the 17th district (1991–present) and accountant (endorsed Lierman)
 Brian Feldman, state senator (2013–present) and former state delegate (2003–2013) for the 15th district (endorsed Lierman)
 Peter Franchot, incumbent Comptroller (ran for governor)
 James Rosapepe, state senator for the 21st district (2007–present) and former Ambassador to Romania (1998–2001) (ran for re-election)

Endorsements

Debates and forums

Fundraising

Polling

Results

Republican primary

Candidates

Nominee
Barry Glassman, Harford County executive (2014–present)

Endorsements

Debates and forums

Fundraising

Results

General election

Debates and forums

Endorsements

Fundraising

Polling

Results

See also
 Elections in Maryland
 2022 United States elections
 2022 Maryland gubernatorial election
 2022 Maryland Attorney General election
 2022 United States Senate election in Maryland
 2022 United States House of Representatives elections in Maryland

Notes

Partisan clients

References

External links 
Official campaign websites
 Barry Glassman (R) for Comptroller
 Brooke Lierman (D) for Comptroller

Comptroller
Maryland
Maryland comptroller elections